Satan's Circus is a 1932 collection of short stories with a supernatural theme by the British writer Eleanor Smith, several of which have been included in anthologies over the years.

References

Bibliography
 Vinson, James. Twentieth-Century Romance and Gothic Writers. Macmillan, 1982.

1932 short story collections
Works by Lady Eleanor Smith
Victor Gollancz Ltd books